para-Cresidine is an organic compound with the formula CH3OC6H3(CH3)NH2.  It is a white solid that is soluble in organic solvents.  The compound features both amine and methoxy functional groups.  It is used as an intermediate in preparation of dyes and pigments.

Synthesis and reactions
The compound is obtained in several steps from 4-chlorotoluene.  Nitration gives mainly 3-nitro-4-chlorotoluene, which reacts with methoxide sources to give 4-methoxy-2-nitrotoluene.  Reduction of this nitro compound affords the aniline. 

Sulfonation with oleum gives 4-amino-5-methoxy-2-methylbenzenesulfonic acid.  This sulfonic acid is a precursor to allura red AC, a red food coloring.

References

External links
International Chemical Safety Card, Center for Disease Control

IARC Group 2B carcinogens
Phenol ethers
Anilines
Alkyl-substituted benzenes